Paratherina wolterecki is a species of fish in the subfamily Telmatherininae, part of the rainbowfish family Melanotaeniidae. This species is endemic to Lakes Towuti and Mahalona on the Indonesian island of Sulawesi. Their environment is pelagic and they live in tropical climates. It has the characteristic of having a mouth pointed upward. The specific name honours the hydrologist and biologist Richard Woltereck (1877-1944), who collected specimens of all four species in the genus Paratherina and who sketched them from life.

References

wolterecki
Fish described in 1935
Taxonomy articles created by Polbot